The 1971 Piccadilly World Match Play Championship was the eighth World Match Play Championship. It was played from Thursday 7 to Saturday 9 October on the West Course at Wentworth. Eight players competed in a straight knock-out competition, with each match contested over 36 holes. The champion received £8,500 out of a total prize fund of £25,000. In the final, Gary Player beat Jack Nicklaus 5 & 4 to win the championship for the fourth time.

In his first round match, Jack Nicklaus went 4 up over Lu Liang-Huan after six holes but Lu levelled the match by the 12th hole and went ahead at the 16th. Nicklaus won the 18th to be level at lunch. Nicklaus then went 3 up after eight holes in the afternoon and although Lu reduced the deficit to 1 hole, Nicklaus holed a long putt for a birdie at the 16th to take a two-hole lead and won 2 & 1 at the next hole. Neil Coles won six holes in a row against Charles Coody from the 12th to the 17th holes of the first round and went to lunch six holes up. Coles eventually won by a score of 5 & 4.

In the final between Jack Nicklaus and Gary Player, Nicklaus was 1 up at lunch but Player won the first four holes in the afternoon and, with Nicklaus missing a number of short putts, Player eventually won 5 & 4. It was his fourth win in the eight World Match Play events contested.

Course
Source:

Scores
Source:

Prize money
The winner received £8,500, the runner-up £4,500, the losing semi-finalists £3,000 and the first round losers £1,500, making a total prize fund of £25,000.

References

Volvo World Match Play Championship
Golf tournaments in England
Piccadilly World Match Play Championship
Piccadilly World Match Play Championship
October 1971 sports events in the United Kingdom